Miguel Berry (born 16 September 1997) is a Spanish professional footballer who plays as a striker for Major League Soccer club Atlanta United.

Youth and amateur career 
Berry was born in Barcelona, Spain to American parents. They moved back to the United States when Berry was eight-years old and Berry grew up in Poway, California, attending Poway High School. Berry also played with USSDA academy side San Diego Surf SC until 2016.

In 2016, Berry went to play college soccer at the University of San Diego. He played with the Toreros for four years, making 72 appearances, scoring 38 goals and tallying 16 assists. In his senior year, Berry was named the WCC Co-Player of the Year and he was a semifinalist for the MAC National Player of the Year award. He'd previously been named WCC All-Freshman Team in his freshman year, was named to the All-WCC First Team and All-Far West Region Second Team in his sophomore year and earned All-WCC First Team and USC All-Far West Region Second Team honors in his junior season.

While at college, Berry also played in the USL League Two for both Seattle Sounders U-23 and Orange County SC U-23.

Professional career

Columbus Crew
On 9 January 2020, Berry was selected 7th overall in the 2020 MLS SuperDraft by Columbus Crew. He officially joined the club on 27 February 2020. After having made no appearances for the team during the first half of the season, and with a lack of future opportunities due to the cancellation of the U.S. Open Cup, Berry was loaned to San Diego Loyal of the USL Championship. Though Berry failed to make any appearances in his first season with the Crew, he was part of the squad that won the 2020 MLS Cup.

On 14 December 2020, the Crew announced that they had exercised the option to retain Berry for the 2021 season.

During the beginning of the 2021 season, Berry appeared in just one league game, playing only one minute. Seeing no opportunity on the horizon, Berry asked to be loaned back to the San Diego Loyal to get some playing time. The Columbus Crew recalled Berry in early July, due to starting striker Gyasi Zardes being called up to the Gold Cup. Berry went on to make 18 appearances, scoring 8 goals at a rate of 1 goal every 105 minutes.

Loan to San Diego Loyal
On 28 August 2020, Berry was loaned to USL Championship side San Diego Loyal for the remainder of the 2020 season. He made his debut the following day, starting in a 0–0 draw with Orange County SC. Berry played in all seven matches that he was available for the Loyal, scoring three goals. Notably, Berry was a part of the team that both forfeited and walked off the field for matches against Los Angeles Galaxy II and Phoenix Rising respectively, due to unpunished racist and homophobic slurs directed at teammates. These moves were widely applauded, however, they cost the team a spot in the 2020 playoffs.

On 28 May 2021, Berry re-joined the club on loan for the 2021 season. However, he was recalled early in July by Columbus.

D.C. United 
On July 18, 2022 Berry was traded to D.C. United for $225,000 in General Allocation Money spread across 2 years; with an additional $100,000 able to be earned if Berry meets certain performance-based incentives.

Career statistics

Honours 
Columbus Crew
MLS Cup: 2020
Campeones Cup: 2021

Notes

References

External links 
 Columbus profile 
 

1997 births
Living people
Footballers from Barcelona
People from Poway, California
Spanish footballers
American soccer players
Spanish people of American descent
Sportspeople from San Diego County, California
Association football forwards
San Diego Surf SC players
Columbus Crew draft picks
Columbus Crew players
Orange County SC U-23 players
San Diego Loyal SC players
San Diego Toreros men's soccer players
Seattle Sounders FC U-23 players
Soccer players from California
USL Championship players
USL League Two players
Major League Soccer players
D.C. United players
Atlanta United FC players